The Palace of Nine Perfections was a summer palace of the Tang dynasty, located in Linyou in the mountains north-west of the capital Chang'an.

The palace was built for Emperor Taizong as a renovation of the earlier Renshou palace built for the Emperor Wen of Sui.  The project was ordered in the fifth year of his reign (631) and the emperor visited each year in the summer.  In the second summer (632), he discovered a spring which was dug out and found to provide sweet water.  A stele was erected to record this with an inscription composed by chancellor Wei Zheng and carved by the imperial calligrapher, Ouyang Xun.  This is a famous example of his calligraphy and rubbings are now held by several museums.  The palace is also the subject of paintings and music such as "The Palace of Nine Perfections" by Eric Ewazen.

Gallery

See also
 Palace of Perfection

References

Buildings and structures in Xi'an
Palaces in China
Royal residences in China
Tang dynasty architecture